Nancy Lynn Thies (born June 10, 1957) is a retired American gymnast. Aged 15, she competed in six events at the 1972 Summer Olympics with the best individual result of 27th place on the balance beam.

Thies finished third all-around at the 1972 AAU Meet and fifth at the 1972 U.S. Olympic Trials. After graduating from the University of Illinois she became an author and journalist, working in public relations. She also served as vice-chair for women at USA Gymnastics, headed the USA Gymnastics athlete wellness program, and occasionally acted as a commentator for gymnastics-related TV broadcasts.

References

External links
 

1957 births
Living people
American female artistic gymnasts
Olympic gymnasts of the United States
Gymnasts at the 1972 Summer Olympics
Sportspeople from Denver
21st-century American women